The Somerset Island Formation is a geologic formation in Northwest Territories. It preserves fossils dating back to the Silurian period.

See also

 List of fossiliferous stratigraphic units in Northwest Territories

References

 

Silurian Northwest Territories
Silurian northern paleotropical deposits